In telecommunication, the term wideband modem has the following meanings: 

A modem whose modulated output signal can have an essential frequency spectrum that is broader than that which can be wholly contained within, and faithfully transmitted through, a voice channel with a nominal 4 kHz bandwidth.  
A modem whose bandwidth capability is greater than that of a narrowband modem.

References

Networking hardware
Modems